Sanjit Kharel is an Indian politician. He was elected to the Sikkim Legislative Assembly from Namthang-Rateypani in the 2019 Sikkim Legislative Assembly election as a member of the Sikkim Krantikari Morcha. He is Minister of Tourism & Civil aviation and Commerce & Industries in P. S. Golay Cabinet.

References

1977 births
Living people
Sikkim Krantikari Morcha politicians
People from Namchi district
Sikkim MLAs 2019–2024
University of North Bengal alumni